The Scottish First Division season 1980–81 was won by Hibs by six points over nearest rival Dundee.

League table

Promotion

Hibs and Dundee finished first and second respectively and were promoted to the 1981–82 Scottish Premier Division.

Relegation

Stirling Albion and Berwick Rangers finished 13th and 14th respectively and were relegated to the 1981–82 Scottish Second Division. In a Scottish League record Stirling failed to score in their last 14 league matches - their last goal of the league season was on 31 January in a 1-0 win over Dunfermline. They then only scored in 2 of their first 7 league games the following season.

References 

 Scottish Football Archive

2
Scottish First Division seasons
Scot